John Arbuthnot (1667–1735) was physician to Queen Anne of the United Kingdom.

John Arbuthnot or John Arbuthnott may also refer to:

Viscounts
John Arbuthnott, 5th Viscount of Arbuthnott (1692–1756)
John Arbuthnott, 6th Viscount of Arbuthnott (1703–1791)
John Arbuthnott, 7th Viscount of Arbuthnott (1754–1800)
John Arbuthnott, 8th Viscount of Arbuthnott (1778–1860), Scottish peer and soldier
John Arbuthnott, 9th Viscount of Arbuthnott (1806–1891), Scottish peer and soldier
John Arbuthnott, 10th Viscount of Arbuthnott (1843–1895)
John Arbuthnott, 14th Viscount of Arbuthnott (1882–1960)
John Arbuthnott, 16th Viscount of Arbuthnott (1924–2012), Scottish peer and businessman

Others
John Arbuthnot (agriculturist) (c. 1729–1797), Inspector General of the Irish Linen Board
John Arbuthnot (Canadian politician) (1861–1931), mayor of Winnipeg
John Bernard Arbuthnot (1875–1950), British soldier and author for the Daily Express
Sir John Arbuthnot, 1st Baronet (1912–1992), British Member of Parliament
Sir John Arbuthnott (microbiologist) (1939–2023), Scottish microbiologist
John A. Arbuthnot (1802–1875), British banker